Mateo Viñals (born 17 October 1998) is an Uruguayan rugby union player, currently playing for Súper Liga Americana de Rugby side Peñarol. His preferred position is centre or wing.

Professional career
Viñals signed for Súper Liga Americana de Rugby side Peñarol ahead of the 2021 Súper Liga Americana de Rugby season, before re-signing ahead of the 2022 season. He has also represented the Uruguay national team.

In 2022, Viñals competed for Uruguay at the Rugby World Cup Sevens in Cape Town.

References

External links
itsrugby.co.uk Profile

1998 births
Living people
Uruguayan rugby union players
Rugby union centres
Rugby union wings
Peñarol Rugby players